Christian Dubé may refer to:

 Christian Dubé (ice hockey)
 Christian Dubé (politician)